Queen is a subway station on Line 1 Yonge–University in Toronto, Ontario, Canada. It is located under Yonge Street north from Queen Street to Shuter Street. Wi-Fi service is available at this station.

History 
The original address given to the station, 171 Yonge Street, is still commonly used in Toronto Transit Commission (TTC) system maps, but this address is not used for any nearby buildings and points to the actual intersection. The address provided by the TTC website, 3 Queen Street East, is located across from the Maritime Life Tower, by the 1 Queen Street East subway entrance.

In 1997, this station became accessible with elevators.

On December 13, 2013, the Toronto Police were called in after gun shots were fired on board a subway train at the station. The Passenger Assistance Alarm was pressed, and the station was evacuated soon after. A man in his 20s was shot and was rushed to nearby St. Michael's Hospital in life-threatening condition, but stable on the day after.

Lower Queen
Early subway expansion plans called for an east–west subway for streetcars under Queen Street, and a lower Queen station for these was roughed-in under the subway station. Priorities changed and the line was never built, but many people unknowingly pass through this lower station every day; two pedestrian tunnels, which go under the Line 1 tracks to allow riders to move between the northbound and southbound platforms, use portions of this intended station, with most of the excess infrastructure walled off. The roughed-in streetcar station is accessed from a locked door along one of the pedestrian tunnels. The second pedestrian tunnel occupies the westbound streetcar platform area. An elevator shaft occupies part of Lower Queen. The streetcar platforms are low-level and short in length.

What exists is a roughed-out second set of platforms built underneath a currently-operating station. It is located directly underneath the existing station. The station was designed as part of a planned but never-built streetcar subway that would have run east and west along Queen Street. A similar station was planned underneath the existing  (also situated along Queen Street). Although underground pipes and conduits were specifically routed around this intended site, construction was never started.

The trackway was planned for streetcars rather than dedicated subway trains, similar to the much newer streetcar-only underground track originating at Union station used for the 510 Spadina and 509 Harbourfront routes. The Queen subway would have allowed streetcars from the 501 Queen, 504 King, 503 Kingston Road, and 505 Dundas to avoid centre-city traffic, and then surface to run on regular streets in outlying areas.

The plan to build a streetcar subway under Queen Street was delayed and then cancelled in favour of an east–west line further north, which became Line 2 Bloor–Danforth. As a result, the Lower Queen Station was never put into service. Unlike the abandoned platform at Lower Bay, this station is not used in any way save as an occasional storage facility and film set, and the aforementioned pedestrian tunnels.

There are plans to use space within Lower Queen to facilitate passenger transfers between Line 1 and the future Ontario Line, which would be drilled out of rock at a lower level.

Station description

The station lies under Yonge Street north of Queen Street to Shuter Street. The station has seven entrances from street level, which includes accessible entrances from inside the Eaton Centre and the Maritime Life Tower. Other entrances include a sidewalk staircase entrance from Shuter Street, and other entrances from 1 Queen Street East, 8 Queen Street West, by Hudson's Bay Queen Street, and from the north entrance outside the Eaton Centre.

Below street level are the concourses, with one above and across the north end of the platforms and at the south there is one on each side at track level with an underpass to connect them.

The only tenant in the station is Gateway Newstands, and there is one located on both platforms inside the fare-paid area.

Architecture and art 

The station contains painted murals by John Boyle at the platform level entitled Our Nell, featuring depictions of Nellie McClung, William Lyon Mackenzie, as well as the former Simpson's and Eaton's department stores.

Nearby landmarks
Nearby landmarks include the Hudson's Bay Company's Queen Street store, the south end of the Eaton Centre, the Old City Hall courts, Nathan Phillips Square, Toronto City Hall, the Elgin and Winter Garden Theatres, and Massey Hall.

Surface connections

A transfer is required to connect between the subway system and these surface routes:

TTC routes serving the station include:

Future 

Metrolinx plans to construct the Ontario Line – a rapid transit line connecting the south loop of Line 1 Yonge–University to the east wing of Line 2 Bloor–Danforth and north to Science Centre station, where the line will interchange with Line 5 Eglinton. The preferred route of the line is from Science Centre to Exhibition. Queen station is a planned station on this new line and will make use of the roughed-in section of Lower Queen station to facilitate passenger transfers between Line 1 and the new line. The Ontario Line would be drilled out of rock at a lower level.

See also
 Queen Street subway

References

External links

Toronto's Lost Subway Stations: Lower Queen
 published in August 2017 by Your Morning 

Line 1 Yonge–University stations
PATH (Toronto)
Railway stations in Canada opened in 1954